Street Dreams is the second studio album by American rapper Fabolous. The album was released on March 4, 2003, by Desert Storm Records and Elektra Records. It was received moderately from a critical standpoint and was a commercial success. It reached number three on the US Billboard 200, with 185,000 copies sold in its first week.

It had four charting singles, but only "Into You", which featured Tamia (and an alternate version, featuring Ashanti) and "Can't Let You Go" were major successes. Produced by Just Blaze and guest vocals from Lil' Mo and Mike Shorey, "Can't Let You Go" reached number one on the Rhythmic Top 40, and number four on the US Billboard Hot 100 chart. "Into You" with the help of Ashanti/Tamia also reached number four on the Billboard Hot 100. The remix of "Trade It All", which featured P. Diddy and Jagged Edge reached number 20 on the chart.

Critical reception
Street Dreams was met with "mixed or average" reviews from critics. At Metacritic, which assigns a weighted average rating out of 100 to reviews from mainstream publications, this release received an average score of 51 based on 13 reviews.

Commercial performance
Street Dreams debuted at number three on the US Billboard 200 with 185,000 copies sold in its first week. This became Fabolous' second US top-ten debut. In its second week, the album dropped to number seven on the chart, selling an additional 92,600 copies. In its third week, the album dropped to number eight on the chart, selling 64,000 more copies. On September 22, 2003, the album was certified platinum by the Recording Industry Association of America (RIAA) for sales of over a million copies. As of August 2004, the album sold over 1.3 million copies in the United States, according to Nielsen Soundscan.

Track listing

Notes
 signifies additional producer
Sample credits
"Damn" samples from "Rapper's Delight" (1979) as written by Bernard Edwards and Nile Rodgers, and performed by The Sugarhill Gang.
"Bad Bitch" embodies portions of "Set It Off" (1984) as written by Steve Standard, and performed by Strafe.
"Sickalicious" embodies portions of "Reelin' In the Years" (1973) as written by Walter Becker and Donald Fagen, and performed by Steely Dan.
"Into You" contains an interpolation of "So into You" (1998) as written by Tim Kelley and Bob Robinson, and performed by Tamia.
"My Life" contains an interpolation of "Very Special" (1981) as written by Lisa Peters and William Jeffrey, and performed by Debra Laws.

Charts

Weekly charts

Year-end charts

Certifications

References

2003 albums
Fabolous albums
Albums produced by Rick Rock
Albums produced by Kanye West
Albums produced by Just Blaze
Albums produced by DJ Clue?